Kehrsatz Castle is a castle in the municipality of Kehrsatz of the canton of Bern in Switzerland.

History
The castle was built in the late 16th century.  In 1795 Emanuel von Tscharner purchased it from the family of General Karl Hackbrett.  The Tscharner family already owned two other estates in Kehrsatz, Lohn Estate and Blumenhof.  The 1798 French invasion and creation of the Helvetic Republic reduced the political power of the local patricians, but the Tscharner family retained ownership of all three estates.  However, over the following years, the estates were inherited by various members of the family and eventually sold.  In 1862 the Tscharners in Kehrsatz Castle died childless and bequeathed it to the Inselspital in Bern.

In 1889 the castle became a girls' boarding school.  Between 1950-54, most of the surrounding farm land was leased out, the old barn was demolished and a farm house was built.  The building was eventually changed from a girls school into a school for children and parents who had trouble socializing or needed therapy.  In 1998, two public school homes, Landorf Köniz and Schlossli Kehrsatz, were combined into a single institution.

Owners of the castle

See also
 List of castles in Switzerland

References

External links
 
 Zentrum für Sozial- und Heilpädagogik Landorf Köniz-Schlössli Kehrsatz website
Diagrams and maps of the Herrschaft Kehrsatz:
 Urbar aller der Twingherrschaft Kärsatz Documenten, Brieffen, Siglen und Gewarsammen, (Staatsarchiv Bern, C I b 130 a).
 	Marchbeschreibung zwischen dem Stadtgericht und der Herrschaft Kehrsatz 1668, (Burgerbibliothek Bern, Mss.h.h.XLII.21).
 Herrschafts-Urbar von Kehrsatz 1688, (Burgerbibliothek Bern, Mss.h.h.XLII.17).
  Marchplan 1689, (Staatsarchiv Bern, AA IV Seftigen 19 (1)).
 Marchplan 1719, (Staatsarchiv Bern, AA IV Seftigen 22).
 Marchplan 1743, (Staatsarchiv Bern, AA IV Seftigen 23).
 Vogtsrodel für die Herrschaft Kehrsatz 1776-1794, (Staatsarchiv Bern, Bez Seftigen A 429).

Castles in the Canton of Bern